Kigarama is a district (akarere) of the Rwandan province of Kibungo. Population: 62,773 (2002 figures); area: 249 square kilometers.

References 

Districts and municipalities of Kibungo